Eimeo may refer to:
 Moorea, Tahiti, formerly known as Eimeo
 Eimeo, Queensland, a town in Australia